Greg Pankewicz (born October 6, 1970) is a Canadian ice hockey coach and former professional ice hockey player. Pankewicz played 21 games in the National Hockey League for the Ottawa Senators and Calgary Flames. He recorded three assists and 22 penalty minutes in his NHL career. From 2003 to 2009, he played for the Colorado Eagles of the Central Hockey League.

Pankewicz turned pro in 1992, and spent most of his 16 seasons in the minor leagues, recording over 500 professional goals. In 2006–07, he helped lead the Eagles to their second Ray Miron President's Cup title in three years. Pankewicz's 32 points in the playoffs set a CHL league record, and earned him the playoff MVP.

In 2009, Pankewicz retired from the Eagles and as franchise leading goal-scorer he was the first Eagle to have his number 89 retired by the team. Pankewicz subsequently joined the team as an assistant coach.

Pankewicz became famous after a 19 February 2011 game between the Eagles and the Mississippi RiverKings. Enraged by the referee, he stripped half naked on the players' bench, throwing his suit, shirt and shoes on the ice before exiting shirtless.

At the conclusion of the 2012–13 season, Pankewicz left the Colorado Eagles, after four seasons as an assistant coach to pursue other ventures.

Career statistics

References

External links

1970 births
Living people
Calgary Flames players
Canadian expatriate ice hockey players in the United States
Canadian ice hockey forwards
Chicago Wolves players
Colorado Eagles players
Houston Aeros (1994–2013) players
Ice hockey people from Alberta
Kentucky Thoroughblades players
Knoxville Cherokees players
Manitoba Moose (IHL) players
New Haven Senators players
Ottawa Senators players
Pensacola Ice Pilots players
People from Brazeau County
Portland Pirates players
Prince Edward Island Senators players
Regina Pats players
Saint John Flames players
Sherwood Park Crusaders players
Undrafted National Hockey League players
Wilkes-Barre/Scranton Penguins players